Monika Salzer (born 11 February 1948) is an Austrian  psychotherapist, Protestant theologian and pastor, columnist, and author. She worked in hospitals handling clinical pastoral care for the seriously ill, including the education of voluntary caretakers. Later, she had a private practice as a systematic psychotherapist, helped to restructure the organisation of the Protestant Church of the Augsburg Confession in Austria, was a columnist for the Kronen Zeitung, and co-founded the protest initiative Omas gegen Rechts (Grannies against the Right).

Life and career 
Salzer was born in Vienna into a multi-cultural family. After the Matura, she was trained to be a laboratory assistant at the Vienna General Hospital, completing a diploma. She then studied psychology at the University of Vienna from 1968 to 1970. She studied Protestant theology from 1977 to 1983.

She founded church services for bereaved people (Gottesdienst für Trauernde) at the Lutheran City Church, and an association called Zentrum für Seelsorge und Kommunikation (SeKo) of the Protestant Church of the Augsburg Confession which became a registered association (eingetragener Verein) in 1994), which offered courses in death and grief counselling for more than 13 years.

Salzer studied at the Institut für Systematische Therapie (IFS) to become a systematic psychotherapist. She then opened her own office. She received further education in the systematic development of organisations (Systemische Organisationsentwicklung) at the Faculty for Interdisciplinary Research and Continuing Education of the University of Klagenfurt, completing as a Master of Advanced Studies.

From 2006, Salzer wrote, alternating with Ingrid Bachler and Ingrid Tschank, a column "Im Gespräch" (In conversation) in the Sunday edition Krone Bunt of the Kronen Zeitung.

In 2017, Salzer was a founding member of the initiative Omas gegen Rechts together with Susanne Scholl. It was registered as an association in May 2018.

Personal life 
Monika Salzer is married to Martin Salzer, a physician and specialist in bone tumors and founder of Austrian Doctors for Disabled and Doctors for Disabled International. They have two children and the couple live in Eichgraben, Lower Austria.

In 2013, Salzer took part in the eighth season of the Austrian TV dance show Dancing Stars and achieved eighth place with her dance partner Florian Gschaider.

Publications

References

Further reading 
 Manuela Tomic: Monika Salzer: In Rente und Rebellion. In: Die Zeit, No. 9/2018, 22 February 2018
 Ingo Hasewend: Omas gegen Rechts: Rebellion der Wiener Rothauben (in German) In: Kleine Zeitung, 24 May 2018

External links 

 

20th-century Lutheran clergy
21st-century Lutheran clergy
Austrian women writers
Psychotherapists
1948 births
Living people
University of Vienna alumni